Jess Elwood "Woody" Dow (December 16, 1916 – March 24, 2003) was an American football player and coach.  He played college football at West Texas State College—now West Texas A&M University—and then professionally with the Philadelphia Eagles of the National Football League (NFL).  Dow served as the head football coach at Southern Connecticut State University—then known as New Haven State Teachers College and Southern Connecticut State College—from 1948 to 1965, compiling a record of 107–41–6. He was inducted into the College Football Hall of Fame as a coach in 2013.

References

External links
 
 

1916 births
2003 deaths
American football fullbacks
Philadelphia Eagles players
Southern Connecticut State Owls football coaches
West Texas A&M Buffaloes football players
College Football Hall of Fame inductees
People from Littlefield, Texas